Jyotsna Radhakrishnan (born 5 September 1986) is an Indian playback singer. She predominantly works in 12+ languages including Malayalam,  Tamil, Telugu and Kannada. She has sung more than 1000 songs. She is based in Thrissur, Kerala.
Jyotsna gained wider recognition for singing popular songs such as “Karuppinazhaku” from Swapnakoodu (2003), “Themma Themma Themmadikkatte” from  Rain Rain Come Again (2004) and "Raftara" from Lucifer (2019).

Early life
Jyotsna was born in Kuwait. At a very young age she moved to Abu Dhabi, United Arab Emirates.

Singing career
Jyotsna's interest in music started at a very young age. She learned the Carnatic vocal style under Mangad Natesan, and the Hindustani classical vocal style under Guru Dinesh Devdas.

Although she started her career in Malayalam cinema with the song "Valakilukkam Kettedee" from the film Pranayamani Thooval in 2002. It was "Sughamanee Nilavu" from Nammal that brought her to wider attention. She has sung in almost 800 movies, in Malayalam as well as in Tamil and Telugu. She has sung on some 200 albums. Some of her hits are "Karuppinazhagu" from Swapnakoodu, "Melleyonnu" from Manassinakkare, and "Meheruba" from Perumazhakkalamand also Raftara in "Lucifer"  in Malayalam

Some of her latest films are Classmates, Pothen Vava, Don, Notebook and Janmam. She has traveled to the UK, the US, Australia and Singapore for musical programs, and has performed with almost all leading playback singers of south India. She concluded another North American tour with singer G. Venugopal and in August 2013 in Australia with Unni Menon performing for Malayalees in major cities. This was her first trip to Australia where she was accompanied by Ramesh Pisharody.

Personal life 
On 26 December 2010, Jyotsna married Sreekanth Surendran, a software engineer from Kochi. She gave birth to their first child, a boy, on 9 July 2015.

Awards
Asianet Film Awards:
 2002 - Best Female Playback - Nammal

Kerala Film Critics Award:

2013 - Best Female playback Singer - Zachariayude Garbhinikal
2017 - Best Female Playback Singer - Kaattu
 Winner of Title trophy "Rasna Girl 2001", an open UAE music competition in Hindi film songs
 Prize winner in "Sangeetha Prathibha Sangamam", an open UAE music competition in Malayalam film songs
 Shruthi Bharatham Award for best Female Playback Singer 2003
 "Yuva Prathibha" award by Pallavoor Appu Marar Smaraka Kala KshetRa 2003
 All Kerala Youth Campus Critics Award 2004
 Mahatma Gandhi Education Foundation Award 2004
 "Outstanding Young Person" Award by Jaycees
 Kaveri Film Critics TV Award 2004
 Jaycees Foundation Award for Best Female Playback Singer
 Film Audience Award 2005
 Gulf Malayalam Music Award 2006
Mazhavil Mango Music awards 2017 -Best Non Film song

Discography: Malayalam

2002

2003

2004

2005

2006

2007

2008

2009

2010

2011

2012

2013

2014

2015

2016

2017

2018

2019

2020

Albums
Ini Varumo- (Herself Composing)
Krishna-The Enternal (fusion/Meditation)- Composing her with Gireesh Chengannur
 Manicheppu Chempakame Onnalla Malayalippennu Krishnapriya Mayakkannaa Ithu Premamo Ninneyum thedi [mailanchi] Serials
Kanakkinavu
Manaporutham
Makalude Amma
Minnukettu
Geethanjali

Discography: Other Languages
Tamil

Telugu

Kannada

TelevisionIdea Star Singer as Team captain (Asianet)Gandharva sangeetham as Host (Kairali TV)2 Crore Apple Mega Star As Host (Jeevan TV)
Duet as Host (Amrita TV)
Music Mojo as Singer (Kappa TV)
Pathinalam Ravu as Judge (Media One)
Veruthe Alla Bharya Season 3 as Grand Finale Host (Mazhavil Manorama)
Padam Namuk Padam as Judge (Mazhavil Manorama)
 Still Standing as Participant (Mazhavil Manorama) 
Top Singer Season 1 as Judge  (Flowers TV)
Super 4 Season 2 as Judge (Mazhavil Manorama)
Atham Pathu Ruchi 2021 as Celebrity presenter (Mazhavil Manorama)
Super 4 Kids as Judge (Mazhavil Manorama)

Appeared films
 2008 - Thirakkatha as RJ
 2010 - Kaaryasthan as Herself
 2021 - Vidhi : The Verdict as Herself

References

External links

 Official website
 

1986 births
Living people
Indian women playback singers
Malayalam playback singers
Singers from Thrissur
Film musicians from Kerala
Women musicians from Kerala
21st-century Indian singers
21st-century Indian women singers
20th-century Indian singers
20th-century Indian women singers